Robert David Murray (27 March 1915, date of death unknown) was a Scottish footballer who played as a forward. Born in Newhaven, Edinburgh, he played for Heart of Midlothian, Manchester United, Bath City and Colchester United.

Honours

Club
Colchester United
 Southern Football League: 1938–39

References

External links
Profile at MUFCInfo.com

1915 births
Year of death missing
Scottish footballers
Association football forwards
Heart of Midlothian F.C. players
Manchester United F.C. players
Bath City F.C. players
Colchester United F.C. players